Got Talent Portugal (season 2) was the 2nd season of the talent show Got Talent Portugal. This was a Portuguese version of the British show Britain's Got Talent.

As in the previous series, each judge was empowered to press the golden buzzer once in the auditions. On the judging panel Mariza replaced Rui Massena for this series.

Semifinalist summary
Eight acts performed each week including a wild card show. There was only one buzz in the semi-finals.

Semi-final rounds

Semi-Final 1

Semi-Final 2

Semi-Final 3

Semi-Final 4

Semi-Final 5

Semi-Final 6

Wildcards

Final

Ratings

 Legend:
  — Highest rating of the season
  — Lowest rating of the season 

Portugal
2010s Portuguese television series
2016 Portuguese television seasons